St Mary's Church is in the village of Yealand Conyers, Lancashire, England. It is an active Roman Catholic church in the diocese of Lancaster, and is linked with the churches of St Mary of the Angels, Bolton-le-Sands, and Our Lady of Lourdes, Carnforth. The church is recorded in the National Heritage List for England as a designated Grade II listed building. It stands at the south end of the village.

History

The church was built in 1852 for Richard Gillow of nearby Leighton Hall, and designed by the Lancaster architect E. G. Paley. It cost between £1,100 and £1,200. In 2009 the parish was formally linked with the Roman Catholic parishes of Carnforth and Bolton-le-Sands.

Architecture

Exterior
St Mary's is constructed in limestone and has a steep slate-covered roof. Its plan consists of a five-bay nave, a chancel at a lower level, and a north porch. At the west end is a projecting bay with a central buttress. On each side of the buttress is a lancet window. The bay is surmounted by a double gabled bellcote. There are further lancet windows around the church, the east end having three stepped lancets. At the corners of the church are diagonal buttresses. Above the porch doorway is the carving of the Virgin Mary in a sandstone niche.

Interior
The nave has a scissor-braced roof, and the roof of the chancel is arch-braced. The reredos is elaborately carved. The altar is supported by marble columns, and the altar rail is in alabaster with green marble columns. The church contains a family pew for the Gillows at the northwest end, and elsewhere are box pews carved with poppyheads. Only the east window contains stained glass. Also in the church are brasses in memory of members of the Gillow family. The authors of the volume in the Buildings of England series comment that the church was intended to outdo the Anglican church in the village "in size, prominence and quality".

See also

Listed buildings in Yealand Conyers
List of works by Sharpe and Paley

References

Roman Catholic churches in Lancashire
Grade II listed churches in Lancashire
Gothic Revival church buildings in England
Gothic Revival architecture in Lancashire
Roman Catholic churches completed in 1852
19th-century Roman Catholic church buildings in the United Kingdom
E. G. Paley buildings
Roman Catholic Diocese of Lancaster
Churches in the City of Lancaster
1852 establishments in England